is an Olympic medal-winning swimmer from Japan, who won the silver medal in the 200 m butterfly at the 2004 Summer Olympics in Athens, Greece. He was also part of Japan's bronze medal-winning 4 × 100 m medley relay team.

Yamamoto also competed in the 100 m butterfly event, and qualified for the semifinals, but narrowly missed out on qualifying for the final. The 2004 Games were Yamamoto's third Olympic Games. He had previously swum in the 1996 Olympic Games and 2000 Olympic Games, but did not receive a medal at either.

He married swimmer Suzu Chiba in 2002. They have four children together.

References

External links
 databaseOlympics

1978 births
Living people
Asian Games medalists in swimming
Medalists at the 2004 Summer Olympics
Medalists at the FINA World Swimming Championships (25 m)
Olympic bronze medalists for Japan
Olympic bronze medalists in swimming
Olympic silver medalists for Japan
Olympic swimmers of Japan
Sportspeople from Osaka
Swimmers at the 1996 Summer Olympics
Swimmers at the 2000 Summer Olympics
Swimmers at the 2004 Summer Olympics
Swimmers at the 1998 Asian Games
Swimmers at the 2002 Asian Games
Swimmers at the 2006 Asian Games
World Aquatics Championships medalists in swimming
Japanese male butterfly swimmers
Olympic silver medalists in swimming
Asian Games gold medalists for Japan
Asian Games silver medalists for Japan
Medalists at the 1998 Asian Games
Medalists at the 2002 Asian Games
Medalists at the 2006 Asian Games
20th-century Japanese people
21st-century Japanese people